W. P. Mahoney House is in Kingman, Arizona. The house was built in 1919–23. It is a Bungalow/Craftsman style house. Mr. Mahoney came to Arizona as an Irish immigrant, worked the western mines until 1912. He organized the first miners union. In 1914 he served in the Arizona House and 1916 Arizona Senate. He came to Kingman and became the Mohave County Sheriff, he did that from 1918 to 1926 and he lived in the house from 1919 to 1927. He left Kingman in 1927 and continued in public office till 1967. This house was placed on the National Register of Historic Places and the number is 86001163.

It was evaluated for National Register listing as part of a 1985 study of 63 historic resources in Kingman that led to this and many others being listed.

References

Houses on the National Register of Historic Places in Arizona
Houses in Kingman, Arizona
National Register of Historic Places in Kingman, Arizona